Ralph Richard Weigel (October 2, 1921 – April 15, 1992) nicknamed "Wig" was an American professional baseball player, a catcher who appeared in 106 Major League games over three seasons for the Cleveland Indians, Chicago White Sox and Washington Senators.

Weigel's professional career lasted from 1940 through 1949, although he missed the 1943–1945 seasons while serving in the United States Coast Guard during World War II.

His 54 Major League hits included nine doubles and three triples.

References

External links

1921 births
1992 deaths
Baltimore Orioles (IL) players
Baseball players from Ohio
Charleston Senators players
Chattanooga Lookouts players
Chicago White Sox players
Cleveland Indians players
Lima Pandas players
Major League Baseball catchers
Washington Senators (1901–1960) players
Wilkes-Barre Barons (baseball) players
People from Coldwater, Ohio
United States Coast Guard personnel of World War II